This article presents the demographic history of Romania through census results. See Demographics of Romania for a more detailed overview of the country's present-day demographics.

The 1930 census was the only one to cover Greater Romania. Censuses in 1948, 1956, 1966, 1977, 1992, 2002, and 2011 covered Romania's present-day territory, as does the current 2022 census. 

All but the 1948 census, which asked about mother tongue, had a question on ethnicity. Moldavia and Wallachia each held a census in 1859. The Romanian Old Kingdom conducted statistical estimates in 1884, 1889, and 1894, and held censuses in 1899 and 1912. Ion Antonescu's regime also held two: a general one in April 1941, and one for those with "Jewish blood" in May, 1942.

1859–1860 census

1887 estimate

* Mainly in Dobruja (details)

December 1899 census

19 December 1912 census

29 December 1930 census

6 April 1941 census

25 January 1948 census

21 February 1956 census

15 March 1966 census

5 January 1977 census

7 January 1992 census

18 March 2002 census

20 October 2011 census

Ethnic figures for 2011 are given as a percentage of individuals for whom data is available, while the "data unavailable" cohort is given as a percentage of the total population.

1 December 2021 census

The 2021 Romanian census (RPL2021), with the reference day for the census data set at 1 December 2021, was held between February and July 2022, being postponed from its original scheduled year due to the COVID-19 pandemic in Romania. The first provisional results of the RPL2021 published at the end of 2022 show a resident population of Romania of 19,053,815 people.

References

External links 
 2011 Romanian census site from the National Institute of Statistics

Demographics of Romania
Geographic history of Romania
Romania